Gabriel Christie (November 29, 1756 – April 1, 1808) was an American political leader from Perryman, Maryland.

He was born in Perryman.  He served in the Maryland militia during the American Revolution.  He served as a member of the Maryland house of delegates and on a commission for straightening roads.

He represented the sixth district of Maryland in the United States House of Representatives from 1793 to 1797, and again from 1799 to 1801.  The 6th district that he represented was in the north-east corner of Maryland, bordering Pennsylvania and Delaware, and did not cover any of the area that had been in the sixth district before the 1792 redistricting.  By his second term in congress he is generally identified as a Democratic-Republican.

In 1800–1801 he served as a commissioner of Havre de Grace.  He served in the Maryland State Senate (1802–1806).
  
When Christie died in 1808 in Baltimore, Maryland, his body was taken home to Perryman and buried in the Spesutia Cemetery there.

References

References

1756 births
1808 deaths
Maryland state senators
People from Perryman, Maryland
Democratic-Republican Party members of the United States House of Representatives from Maryland
People from Havre de Grace, Maryland
Maryland militiamen in the American Revolution
Burials in Maryland
People of colonial Maryland